Malaysia Baptist Theological Seminary (MBTS) is a denominational seminary affiliated with the Malaysia Baptist Convention. It is located in Batu Ferringhi, Penang, Malaysia. Established in 1954, MBTS is accredited by the Asia Theological Association (ATA).

Brief history

MBTS was established in 1954 by missionaries from the Southern Baptist Convention to train those who can testify to a call to full-time work in a local church.

Organization

MBTS is governed by the Seminary Board of the Malaysia Baptist Convention.

Programs

MBTS offers academic programs leading to the awarding of the following qualifications:

Certificates and diplomas

 Certificate in Christian Counseling
 This certificate program requires the completion of 10 credits and is offered on a part time basis.

 Certificate of Marriage and Family Studies
 This certificate program requires the completion of 10 credits and is offered on a part time basis.

 Diploma in Christian Counseling
 This diploma program requires the completion of 24 credits and is offered on a part time basis.

 Diploma in Early Childhood Christian Education
 This diploma program requires the completion of 20 credits and is offered on a part time basis.

 Diploma in Christian Studies
 This diploma program requires the completion of 72 credits.

 Diploma in Theology
 This diploma program requires the completion of 141 credits and is offered in Malay, English, and Chinese.

Undergraduate

 Bachelor of Theology
 This degree program requires the completion of 154 credits and is offered in Malay, and English.

Postgraduate

 Graduate Diploma in Christian Counseling
 This graduate diploma program requires the completion of 24 credits.

 Graduate Diploma of Christian Studies
 This graduate diploma program requires the completion of 38 credits.

 Master in Christian Studies
 This degree program requires the completion of 72 credits.

 Master of Ministry
 Master of Divinity
 This degree program requires the completion of 119 credits.

 Master of Arts in Mission
 This degree program requires the completion of 40 credits and is conducted in partnership with the US Center for World Mission using the latter's World Christian Foundations study program.

 Master of Arts
 This degree program is offered with the following majors:
 Pastoral Ministry
 Biblical Studies
 Holistic Child Development
 Christian Education
 Evangelism and Church Planting
 Missiology

 Master of Theology
 This degree program requires the completion of 36 credits and is offered with the following majors:
 Biblical Studies
 Missions

 Doctor of Ministry (Pastoral Leadership)
 This degree program requires the completion of 45 credits.

 Doctor of Missiology
 This degree program requires the completion of 45 credits.

Accreditation and affiliation

The following programs offered by MBTS are accredited by the ATA:

 Diploma in Theology
 Bachelor of Theology
 Master in Christian Studies
 Master of Divinity
 Master of Art in Pastoral Studies
 Master of Art in Holistic Child Development
 Doctor of Ministry

MBTS is also a founder member of the Malaysian Association of Theological Schools which allows a certain number of credits in the undergraduate programs to be transferable among member schools.

References

How to apply to study in MBTS

External links
 MBTS Website

Seminaries and theological colleges in Malaysia
Protestantism in Malaysia
Educational institutions established in 1954
1954 establishments in Malaya